Rindern is a village in the Kleve (district) of Lower Rhine region of Germany. It is part of the town Kleve.

History
The town is mentioned, by the name Rinharos, in the 8th century, when Count Ebroin, son of Oda, made a donation to its church.

References 

Kleve